Sefwi-Wiawso is a parliamentary constituency in the Western North Region of Ghana. The member of parliament for the constituency is Kwaku Afriyie, who was elected on the ticket of the New Patriotic Party (NPP) in the 2016 elections.

Members of Parliament

See also
List of Ghana Parliament constituencies

References 

Parliamentary constituencies in the Western North Region